A palindrome is a word, number, phrase, or other sequence of symbols that reads the same backwards as forwards, such as the sentence: "A man, a plan, a canal – Panama". Following is a list of palindromic phrases of two or more words in the English language, found in multiple independent collections of palindromic phrases.

As late as 1821, The New Monthly Magazine reported that there was only one known palindrome in the English language. In the following centuries, many more English palindomes were constructed. For many long-attested or well-known palindromes, authorship can not be determined, although a number can tentatively be attributed to a handful of prolific palindrome creators. Because of the popularity of palindromes as a form of word play, a number of sources have collected and listed popular palindromes, and palindrome-constructing contests have been held.

Notable palindromic phrases in English

See also
List of palindromic places

Notes

References

External links

Palindromes